Sabatinca incongruella is a species of moth of the family Micropterigidae. It is endemic to New Zealand and is found only in the northern parts of the South Island. It is a day flying moth and is on the wing from mid January until late February. The larvae of this species feed on liverworts and the adult moths feed on the spores of fern species in the genus Pneumatopteris. This species can be confused with S. chalcophanes as it is very similar in appearance.

Taxonomy 
This species was first described by Francis Walker in 1863. Walker described the species from specimens collected by T. R. Oxley, a photographer and collector who lived in Nelson. Specimens collected by Oxley and forwarded to the British Museum (now held at the Natural History Museum, London) were mislabeled as being collected in Auckland. It is therefore presumed that the male lectotype specimen, held at the Natural History Museum, London, was collected in Nelson.

Description 

Walker described the male of the species as follows:

The wingspan of the adults of this species is approximately 11 mm and the forewing pattern is made up of four colours. In 1923 Alfred Philpott published a paper where he attempted to find differences between the species within the Sabatinca genus by studying the venation of the hindwings. The venation of the hindwings of S. incongruella were similar in appearance to the majority of species within the genus as they had a "recurrent" vein.

This species can be confused with S. chalcophanes as it is similar in appearance.

Distribution 
This species is endemic to New Zealand and is only found in the northern part of the South Island, from the west of Picton and north of Reefton.

Behaviour 
S. incongruella is on the wing from the middle of January until the end of February. They are a day flying moth.

Host species 

Larvae of this species feed on liverwort species where as the adult moths appear to feed on the spores of ferns within the genus Pneumatopteris. Adults have been recorded as feeding on the spores of Pneumatopteris pennigera.

References

External links

 Image of Sabatinca incongruella.

Micropterigidae
Moths of New Zealand
Moths described in 1863
Endemic fauna of New Zealand
Taxa named by Francis Walker (entomologist)
Endemic moths of New Zealand